Mies de Cozada, colloquially called San Román, is a multi-purpose municipal stadium located in the town of San Román de la Llanilla, in the municipality of Santander, Cantabria, Spain.

It is an artificial grass field opened in 2010 and holding about 1,500 people. The facilities are used by BathCo Independiente RC for playing rugby in División de Honor and by Rayo Cantabria and Atlético San Román for football practice.

See also 
Independiente Rugby Club
División de Honor de Rugby
Deportivo Rayo Cantabria

References 

Rugby union stadiums in Spain
Football venues in Cantabria
Sports venues completed in 2010